In the Ranks is a 1914 British silent drama film directed by Percy Nash and starring Gregory Scott, Daisy Cordell and James Lindsay.

Cast
 Gregory Scott as Ned / John Drayton 
 Daisy Cordell as Jocelyn Hare 
 James Lindsay as Captain Holcroft 
 Peggy Hyland as Barbara Herrick 
 Douglas Payne as Richard Belton 
 Frank Tennant as Captain Wynter 
 Joan Ritz as Ruth Herrick 
 Edward Sass as Gidgeon Blake 
 Jack Denton as Joe Buzzard 
 John East as Farmer Herrick 
 Douglas Cox as Sergeant Searle 
 Ruby Wyndham as Mrs. Buzzard

References

Bibliography
 Goble, Alan. The Complete Index to Literary Sources in Film. Walter de Gruyter, 1999.

External links
 

1914 films
1914 drama films
British silent feature films
British drama films
Films directed by Percy Nash
British black-and-white films
1910s English-language films
1910s British films
Silent drama films